Jessica Alicia Moore (born July 9, 1982) is an American professional basketball player. Moore was a Center for the UConn Huskies from 2000 to 2005.

High school
Moore was introduced to basketball at the age of 10 by her older brother. By the time Moore reached Colony High School in Palmer, Alaska, she was a good all-around athlete. She was on the basketball, track and volleyball teams. The basketball team reached the state finals four times winning the State Championship twice, and the volleyball team also won two State Championships. Jessica was voted Alaska's Athlete Of The Year her junior and senior high school years. Her most memorable experience from high school was winning her first of two State Championships in 1998.

AAU
Moore got recognition from an Athletic Amateur Union (AAU) in Oregon. The coach spoke to Jessica's high school coach, inviting her to play for his team during the second half of the summer. This team traveled all around the country, offering her great exposure. During her sophomore, junior and senior summers, she spent half of it with her Alaska team, and half playing, and living in Oregon.

College
Moore narrowed her college choices down to four – University of California, Los Angeles (UCLA), University of Oregon, University of Connecticut and Ohio State University. She chose the University of Connecticut because of the family atmosphere and the high possibility of winning a National Championship. Once she picked a school she had to decide if she would play both volleyball and basketball or just pick one. She picked basketball to focus on. The basketball team was already stacked with post players so Jessica wasn't going to get much playing time as a freshman. She was a medical red shirted player her first year gaining an extra year of eligibility. It all paid off, the Huskies won three National Championships in Jessica's years at Connecticut. However it would not come without some hardship. During the championship game (the 3rd Championship) Moore suffered a torn anterior cruciate ligament (ACL) injury in the second half of the game. She remained in the game finishing with 14 points, and nine rebounds despite the injury that would require surgery. In May 2005, Moore earned her bachelor's degree in Political Science.

USA Basketball
Moore was named to the USA Women's U19 team which represented the US in the 2001 U19 World's Championship, held in Brno, Czech Republic in July 2001. Moore scored 6.4 points per game, and helped the USA team to a 6–1 record and the bronze medal. She was the third leading rebounder on the team averaging 5.3 per game.

WNBA
Moore was selected number 24 by the Charlotte Sting in the 2005 WNBA Draft. The team struggled and then made some roster changes. She was cut but not without notice from other league teams. Two days later she was picked up by the Los Angeles Sparks where she enjoyed a winning team making it to the WNBA playoffs. In the WNBA off-season she went over to Europe to play basketball. She played in Spain for Universitario de Ferrol, and the next year she played in France for Challes Les Eux.

In 2011, Moore was waived by the Indiana Fever, but picked up by the Connecticut Sun.  She played in the WNBA for a total of 8 seasons.

UConn statistics

Huskies of Honor induction
On December 29, 2013, the University of Connecticut inducted two women's basketball teams into the Huskies of Honor: the National Championship winning teams of 2002–03 and 2003–04. Moore was a player for each of those two seasons.

See also
 Connecticut Huskies women's basketball
 List of Connecticut women's basketball players with 1000 points
 2003–04 Connecticut Huskies women's basketball team

References

External links
 WNBA Player Profile
 Career stats
 UConn Hoop Legends: Jessica Moore 

1982 births
Living people
American women's basketball players
Atlanta Dream players
Basketball players from Alaska
Charlotte Sting players
Connecticut Sun players
Indiana Fever players
Los Angeles Sparks players
People from Matanuska-Susitna Borough, Alaska
Sportspeople from Fairbanks, Alaska
UConn Huskies women's basketball players
Washington Mystics players
Centers (basketball)
Power forwards (basketball)